The Orfeó Català is a choral society based in Barcelona, Catalonia, Spain, which was founded in 1891 by Lluís Millet and Amadeu Vives.

The Palau de la Música Catalana, a major Barcelona landmark, was commissioned for the choral society in 1904, and completed in 1908.

References

External links
 
 

Spanish choirs
Culture in Barcelona
Musical groups from Catalonia
1891 establishments in Spain
Musical groups established in 1891